Nat King Cole Sings/George Shearing Plays is a 1962 studio album by Nat King Cole, featuring the pianist George Shearing. Containing new arrangements of two songs that Nat King Cole made famous in earlier versions: I'm Lost and Lost April.
The album peaked at 27 on the Billboard album chart.

Track listing

Personnel 
 Nat King Cole – vocals
 George Shearing – piano, arranger
 Ralph Carmichael – arranger, conductor

Orchestra Members
 Vibes: Emil Richards (5-15), Warren Chiasson (5-15)
 Guitar: Al Hendrickson (5-15)
 Bass played by: Israel Crosby (5-15), Al McKibbon (5-15)
 Arco Bass: Mike Rubin (5-15)
 Drums: Shelly Manne (5-15), Vernell Fournier (5-15)
 Congas: Armando Peraza (5-15), Carlos Vidal (8-9, 14-15)
 Additional Percussion: Nick Martinis (8-9, 14-15), Luis Miranda (8-9, 14-15)
 Trombone: Lloyd Ullate (8-9, 14-15)
 Reeds: Paul Horn (8-9, 14-15), Justin Gordon (8-9, 14-15), Willie Schwartz (8-9, 14-15)

References 

1962 albums
Nat King Cole albums
George Shearing albums
Albums arranged by Ralph Carmichael
Capitol Records albums
Albums conducted by Ralph Carmichael
Orchestral jazz albums
Vocal–instrumental duet albums
Albums recorded at Capitol Studios